Arbeau Settlement is a rural settlement  in the upper reaches of the Miramichi Valley in Northumberland County, New Brunswick. It is named after the Arbeau family, many of whom have lived in the area over the years.

History

Notable people

See also
List of communities in New Brunswick

References
 

Communities in Northumberland County, New Brunswick